The South Korea national football team has appeared 14 times at the Asian Cup. They have failed to qualify for the finals on three occasions, in 1968, 1976 and 1992. South Korea won the inaugural edition of the tournament in 1956, held in Hong Kong, and successfully defended the title on home soil in 1960. In addition, the team finished as runners-up on four occasions.

Competitive record

Details

1956 (Hong Kong)
South Koreans are inaugural champions of the Asian Cup. South Korea had unfavorable schedule that required them to meet their largest rivals Israel two days after playing their first match, but defeated Israel.

1960 (South Korea)
South Korea won their second consecutive title, and a South Korean forward Cho Yoon-ok became the top goalscorer. However, South Korean players received fake medals, and returned the medals to the Korean FA. The KFA gave real medals to their families in 2019.

1964 (Israel)
The 1964 Asian Cup was held when South Korea had to play the Olympic qualifier against South Vietnam. The Korean FA sent the reserve team to the competition.

1972 (Thailand)

1980 (Kuwait)
South Korea won all matches from the second match to the semi-finals including a match against the host Kuwait. However, they lost in the final where they met Kuwait again. Their 18-year-old striker Choi Soon-ho became the youngest scoring champion in Asian Cup history.

1984 (Singapore) 
South Koreans left their worst result in the 1984 tournament. They got no victory and made only one goal.

1988 (Qatar)
South Koreans got a chance to win their third title again after winning all matches until the semi-finals, but they lost the final to Saudi Arabia after the penalty shoot-out. This was the third time for South Korea to finish as runners-up. Their new star player Kim Joo-sung was named the Most Valuable Player.

1996 (United Arab Emirates)
Before the 1996 tournament, the Korean FA appointed Park Jong-hwan as the new manager. Park was evaluated as the greatest South Korean manager at the time by leading Ilhwa Chunma to three consecutive K League titles, but he disappointed his country in the competition. South Korea finished their group stage in third place, showing shaky start. In the quarter-finals, South Korea held a 2–1 lead against Iran at half-time, but they conceded five goals in the second half including Ali Daei's four goals. After the disaster, Park resigned as manager, and a defender Hong Myung-bo was suspected of slowdown.

2000 (Lebanon)

2004 (China)
South Korea reached the semi-finals in the 2002 FIFA World Cup, but their performance wasn't continued after Guus Hiddink left them. They suffered shock defeats to Oman and Vietnam in the qualification. They were eliminated by the quarter-final defeat to Iran after conceding Ali Karimi's hat-trick and an own goal.

2007 (Indonesia, Malaysia, Thailand and Vietnam)
After excluding three Premier League players (Park Ji-sung, Lee Young-pyo and Seol Ki-hyeon) due to their injuries, South Korea had difficulty again in the Asian Cup. Furthermore, some players including the captain Lee Woon-jae were criticised by fans for visiting a hostess bar in the middle of the group stage. South Korea's outfield players made only three goals during the competition. However, Lee led his team to third place by keeping four clean sheets and winning two penalty shoot-outs.

2011 (Qatar)
After beating Iran in extra time of the quarter-final match, South Korea once again played extra time in the semi-finals against Japan. In this extra time, Hajime Hosogai who moved into the penalty area before Keisuke Honda kicked a penalty scored a controversial goal from the rebound. South Korea scored the equaliser after the misfortune, but lost on penalties.

2015 (Australia)
Under the leadership of manager Uli Stielike, the South Korean players underperformed in the first two matches against Oman and Kuwait. They won both matches, but expressed dissatisfaction with Stielike, who then handed over command to assistant manager Shin Tae-yong for the rest of the tournament. Goalkeeper Kim Jin-hyeon then kept a clean sheet in every match until the final, as the team eliminated Uzbekistan and Iraq in the quarter-finals and semi-finals, respectively. Their opponent in the final was Australia, which they had already beaten 1–0 in the group stage. However, South Korea lost the final 2–1 after extra time, evoking the 1980 final between them and Kuwait.

2019 (United Arab Emirates)

See also
South Korea at the FIFA World Cup
South Korea at the CONCACAF Gold Cup

External links

Korea Football Association official website 

 
Korea Rep.